Ang Tindera is the 1st studio album by Filipino singer-actress Nora Aunor in Filipino. The album was released in 1971 by Alpha Records Corporation in the Philippines in LP format and later released in 1999 in a compilation/ cd format.  The album contains some of the original Filipino compositions by Danny Holmsen, A Fernando and E de la Pena.  The album contains 12 tracks among them is the "Unang Halik" which became one of the most popular songs of Ms. Aunor.

Track listing

Side one

Side two

References

See also
 Nora Aunor discography

Nora Aunor albums
1971 albums